The 1994 Sun Bowl was a college football bowl game played on December 29, 1994. The game pitted the unranked Texas Longhorns against the No. 19 North Carolina Tar Heels. The Tar Heels were led by eventual Texas head coach Mack Brown.

The game was a seesaw offensive battle. Texas, down 31–21 midway through the fourth quarter, mounted a comeback to gain a 35–31 victory, with Priest Holmes's leap into the endzone proving to be the winning points. A record 50,612 attended this game, a high for both the bowl game and the stadium.

This was the first time since 1988 that the Sun Bowl was played under its original name after five years of title sponsorship from John Hancock Insurance.

Scoring summary
First quarter
 North Carolina – Curtis Johnson 11-yd run (Tripp Pignetti kick); Drive: 10 plays, 78 yards, 11:06 remaining
 Texas – Priest Holmes 1-yd run (Phil Dawson kick); Drive: 9 plays, 72 yards, 4:37 remaining
Second quarter
 Texas – Norman Watkins 8-yd fumble return (Dawson kick), 14:49 remaining
 North Carolina – Pignetti 25-yd field goal; Drive: 12 plays, 72 yards, 9:57 remaining
 Texas – Holmes 1-yd run (Dawson kick); Drive: 9 plays, 64 yards, 6:05 remaining
 North Carolina – Marcus Wall 8-yd pass from Mike Thomas (Pignetti kick); Drive: 9 plays, 74 yards, :28 remaining
Fourth quarter
 North Carolina – Wall 82-yd punt return (Pignetti kick), 13:35 remaining
 North Carolina – Octavus Barnes 50-yd pass from Thomas (Pignetti kick); Drive: 5 plays, 79 yards, 9:13 remaining
 Texas – Holmes 9-yd run (Dawson kick); Drive: 8 plays, 68 yards, 6:35 remaining
 Texas – Holmes 5-yd run (Dawson kick); Drive: 10 plays, 68 yards, 1:17 remaining

Priest Holmes had 161 yards on 27 carries for four touchdowns to lead the Longhorns to victory and give him MVP honors.

Statistics

References

Sun Bowl
Sun Bowl
North Carolina Tar Heels football bowl games
Texas Longhorns football bowl games
Bowl Coalition
December 1994 sports events in the United States
1994 in sports in Texas